Luigi Rigamonti (7 April 1920 – 15 July 1990) was an Italian wrestler. He competed in the men's Greco-Roman welterweight at the 1948 Summer Olympics.

References

External links
 

1920 births
1990 deaths
Italian male sport wrestlers
Olympic wrestlers of Italy
Wrestlers at the 1948 Summer Olympics
Sportspeople from Ghent
20th-century Italian people